The 1996 Belgian Grand Prix (formally the LIV Grand Prix de Belgique) was a Formula One motor race held on 25 August 1996 at Spa-Francorchamps. It was the thirteenth race of the 1996 FIA Formula One World Championship.

The 44-lap race was won by Michael Schumacher, driving a Ferrari. Schumacher had crashed heavily in Friday practice, but recovered to qualify third before taking his second win of the season. Jacques Villeneuve, who had started from pole position, finished second in his Williams-Renault, with Mika Häkkinen third in a McLaren-Mercedes. Villeneuve's teammate and Drivers' Championship leader, Damon Hill, finished fifth.

Qualifying

Race 
The start of the race saw the two Saubers of Heinz-Harald Frentzen and Johnny Herbert eliminated immediately when they collided at the La Source hairpin, following an incident that also involved Olivier Panis' Ligier and Rubens Barrichello's Jordan. Panis also retired on the spot; Barrichello was able to continue, pitting to repair his suspension, although it eventually failed altogether on lap 30. On lap 10, Jos Verstappen pitted with a sticking throttle. The Footwork Arrows pit crew found no damage and sent Verstappen back out, only for the Dutchman to crash almost immediately. Team boss Tom Walkinshaw confirmed after the race that the throttle problem had not recurred, and that the crash was caused by a faulty wheel.

The incident brought out the safety car for seven laps, during which time all the drivers besides the McLarens of Mika Häkkinen and David Coulthard (both running a one-stop strategy) made pit stops. Jacques Villeneuve, leading the race when the safety car came out, missed his pit stop on lap 13. As a result, he lost the lead to Michael Schumacher, who eventually won the race by 5.6 seconds from Villeneuve. The Canadian driver later explained that he had misunderstood the radio instruction to come in, due to the confusion brought about by the deployment of the safety car. As a further consequence of Villeneuve's error, teammate Damon Hill was instructed to pit by the Williams engineers, only to then be told to stay out just as he was heading into the pit lane. Hill was driving the spare Williams following a misfire in the Sunday morning warm-up session. By the time he finally got to make his pit stop, he had fallen to 13th, but he recovered to finish fifth.

Running in fourth place at half distance, Gerhard Berger spun off in his Benetton while trying to pass Eddie Irvine's Ferrari, an error which dropped him to 12th. After setting a string of fastest laps he recovered to sixth by the end of the race, thanks in part to Irvine's retirement with gearbox problems. Berger's Benetton teammate Jean Alesi finished fourth after Coulthard had spun off into retirement and crashed on lap 38.

The Tyrrells of Mika Salo and Ukyo Katayama finished in seventh and eighth places respectively; however, a fast early stop during the safety car period saw Salo running as high as third at one point.

Race classification

Championship standings after the race
Bold text indicates the World Champions.

Drivers' Championship standings

Constructors' Championship standings

References

Belgian Grand Prix
Belgian Grand Prix
Grand Prix
Belgian Grand Prix